Cyprus was represented at the 2006 Commonwealth Games in Melbourne by a contingent of 43 sportspersons and officials.

Medals

Medalists

Gold
 Shooting, Men's Skeet Pairs
 George Achilleos, Shooting, Men's Skeet
 Andri Eleftheriou, Shooting, Women's Skeet

Silver
 Shooting, Women's Skeet Pairs

Bronze
 Herodotos Giorgallas, Gymnastics, Men's Rings
 Kyriacos Ioannou, Athletics, Men's High Jump

Nations at the 2006 Commonwealth Games
Commonwealth Games
Cyprus at the Commonwealth Games